Fritz Baade (23 January 1893 – 15 May 1974) was a German politician of the Social Democratic Party (SPD) and member of the German Bundestag.

Life 
From 1949 to 1965 he was a member of the German Bundestag, and from 1949 to 1953 deputy chairman of the committee for ERP issues.

Literature

References

1893 births
1974 deaths
Members of the Bundestag for Schleswig-Holstein
Members of the Bundestag 1961–1965
Members of the Bundestag 1957–1961
Members of the Bundestag 1953–1957
Members of the Bundestag 1949–1953
Members of the Bundestag for the Social Democratic Party of Germany